Cryoturris cerinella , common name the little waxy mangelia, is a species of sea snail, a marine gastropod mollusk in the family Mangeliidae.

Description
The length of the shell varies between 6 mm and 12 mm.

Cryoturris cerinella recalls Kurtziella cerina (Kurtz & Stimpson, 1851) by its color, but it is much larger, more drawn out and slender. The shell contains 7 whorls, omitting the protoconch. It has only six or at most seven ribs, a short aperture, no siphonal canal to speak of, and hardly any indentation for a notch. The suture is less appressed and undulate. While the ribs are almost obsolete in the fasciolar region, the angulation is nearly at the periphery and the slopes either way from it are nearly equal. The shell is whitish toward the vertex, ashy on the intermediate whorls, and with a tendency to orange or flesh-color for the body whorl.  It is never striped or spotted, and the columella is always like the rest of the body whorl.

Distribution
C. cerinella can be found in Atlantic waters, ranging from the coast of North Carolina south to Quintana Roo.; in the Gulf of Mexico and the Caribbean Sea.

References

 G., F. Moretzsohn, and E. F. García. 2009. Gastropoda (Mollusca) of the Gulf of Mexico, Pp. 579–699 in Felder, D.L. and D.K. Camp (eds.), Gulf of Mexico–Origins, Waters, and Biota. Biodiversity. Texas A&M Press, College Station, Texas

External links
 
 J. A. Gardner. 1948. Mollusca from the Miocene and Lower Pliocene of Virginia and North Carolina: Part 2. Scaphopoda and Gastropoda. United States Geological Survey Professional Paper 199(B): 179–310
  Tucker, J.K. 2004 Catalog of recent and fossil turrids (Mollusca: Gastropoda). Zootaxa 682: 1–1295.

cerinella